The Mill at Sanssouci is a 1926 German silent historical film directed by Siegfried Philippi and Frederic Zelnik and starring Otto Gebühr, Lissi Lind and Jakob Tiedtke. The film is part of the popular cycle of Prussian films. It premiered on 1 February 1926.

The film was released by the German subsidiary of the American company Fox Film. It was shot at the Staaken Studios in Berlin. Art direction was by Andrej Andrejew and Gustav A. Knauer. The title alludes to the Historic Mill of Sanssouci constructed in the 18th century.

Plot
Prussia, 1750. After the end of the Silesian Wars, Frederick II returns to Sanssouci exhausted from the events of the war. But the mill of the miller Casper, once the noblest and most expensive construction in the world rattles so loudly, that his majesty feels very disturbed during the time of rest. He issues an edict which should silence the miller and his mill from functioning during the time of peace, but Casper is beyond stubborn. He confronts the king's decree, insisting that all people are equal before the law in Prussia.

Soon the dispute escalates, and Casper decides to even obtain a court ruling in this matter (of which Frederick knows that he can only lose before Justice in view of the equality requirement he had established). Eventually, the two parties decide to seek an out-of-court solution that enables reconciliation. Under various pretenses, His Majesty can promote the marriage of two couples, including two of his soldiers (Lieutenant von Bärenfels and Corporal Jobst) by following in the footsteps of French writer Voltaire, and eventually move things forward in his own amorous affair – his relationship with the dancer Barberina.

Cast

References

External links

Films of the Weimar Republic
German silent feature films
Films directed by Frederic Zelnik
Prussian films
Films set in the 1740s
Films set in the 1750s
Biographical films about German royalty
Cultural depictions of Frederick the Great
Cultural depictions of Voltaire
German historical drama films
1920s historical drama films
German black-and-white films
1926 drama films
Silent historical drama films
1920s German films
Films shot at Staaken Studios
1920s German-language films